The Sorry for Party Rocking Tour was a concert tour by American electropop duo LMFAO. It was LMFAO's first and only concert tour. It was supported by their popular album Sorry For Party Rocking

Background
LMFAO announced the North American concerts of the tour on February 27, 2012 via their Facebook page.

Opening acts
Far East Movement — (North America)
The Quest Crew — North America, part of the main set)
Sidney Samson — (North America)
Eva Simons — (North America)
Natalia Kills — (North America)
Matthew Koma — (North America)
My Name Is Kay — (North America)

Setlist
"Rock the Beat II"
"Sorry for Party Rocking"
"Get Crazy"
"Take It to the Hole"
"Put That A$$ to Work"
"I'm in Miami Bitch"
"Gettin' Over You"
"Boom Boom Pow"
"Shooting Star"
"Reminds Me of You"
"I Am Not a Whore"
"Hot Dog"
"One Day"
"La La La"
"Yes"
"Quest Crew Dance Mashup"
"Shots"
Encore
"Party Rock Anthem"
"Champagne Showers"
"Sexy And I Know It"

Tour dates

References

2012 concert tours